The Schoenflies (or Schönflies) notation, named after the German mathematician Arthur Moritz Schoenflies, is a notation primarily used to specify point groups in three dimensions. Because a point group alone is completely adequate to describe the symmetry of a molecule, the notation is often sufficient and commonly used for spectroscopy. However, in crystallography, there is additional translational symmetry, and point groups are not enough to describe the full symmetry of crystals, so the full space group is usually used instead. The naming of full space groups usually follows another common convention, the Hermann–Mauguin notation, also known as the international notation.

Although Schoenflies notation without superscripts is a pure point group notation, optionally, superscripts can be added to further specify individual space groups. However, for space groups, the connection to the underlying symmetry elements is much more clear in Hermann–Mauguin notation, so the latter notation is usually preferred for space groups.

Symmetry elements
Symmetry elements are denoted by i for centers of inversion, C for proper rotation axes, σ for mirror planes, and S for improper rotation axes (rotation-reflection axes). C and S are usually followed by a subscript number (abstractly denoted n) denoting the order of rotation possible.

By convention, the axis of proper rotation of greatest order is defined as the principal axis. All other symmetry elements are described in relation to it.  A vertical mirror plane (containing the principal axis) is denoted σv; a horizontal mirror plane (perpendicular to the principal axis) is denoted σh.

Point groups

In three dimensions, there are an infinite number of point groups, but all of them can be classified by several families. 

 Cn (for cyclic) has an n-fold rotation axis. 
 Cnh is Cn with the addition of a mirror (reflection) plane perpendicular to the axis of rotation (horizontal plane). 
 Cnv is Cn with the addition of n mirror planes containing the axis of rotation (vertical planes). 
 Cs denotes a group with only mirror plane (for Spiegel, German  for mirror) and no other symmetry elements. 
 S2n (for Spiegel, German for mirror) contains only a 2n-fold rotation-reflection axis. The index should be even because when n is odd an n-fold rotation-reflection axis is equivalent to a combination of an n-fold rotation axis and a perpendicular plane, hence Sn = Cnh for odd n.
 Cni has only a rotoinversion axis. This notation is rarely used because any rotoinversion axis can be expressed instead as rotation-reflection axis: For odd n, Cni = S2n and C2ni = Sn = Cnh, and for even n, C2ni = S2n. Only the notation Ci (meaning C1i) is commonly used, and some sources write C3i, C5i etc.
 Dn (for dihedral, or two-sided) has an n-fold rotation axis plus n twofold axes perpendicular to that axis. 
 Dnh has, in addition, a horizontal mirror plane and, as a consequence, also n vertical mirror planes each containing the n-fold axis and one of the twofold axes.
 Dnd has, in addition to the elements of Dn, n vertical mirror planes which pass between twofold axes (diagonal planes).
 T (the chiral tetrahedral group) has the rotation axes of a tetrahedron (three 2-fold axes and four 3-fold axes). 
 Td includes diagonal mirror planes (each diagonal plane contains only one twofold axis and passes between two other twofold axes, as in D2d). This addition of diagonal planes results in three improper rotation operations S4.
 Th includes three horizontal mirror planes. Each plane contains two twofold axes and is perpendicular to the third twofold axis, which results in inversion center i.
 O (the chiral octahedral group) has the rotation axes of an octahedron or cube (three 4-fold axes, four 3-fold axes, and six diagonal 2-fold axes).
 Oh includes horizontal mirror planes and, as a consequence, vertical mirror planes. It contains also inversion center and improper rotation operations.
 I (the chiral icosahedral group) indicates that the group has the rotation axes of an icosahedron or dodecahedron (six 5-fold axes, ten 3-fold axes, and 15 2-fold axes).
 Ih includes horizontal mirror planes and contains also inversion center and improper rotation operations.
All groups that do not contain more than one higher-order axis (order 3 or more) can be arranged as shown in a table below; symbols in red are rarely used.

In crystallography, due to the crystallographic restriction theorem, n is restricted to the values of 1, 2, 3, 4, or 6. The noncrystallographic groups are shown with grayed backgrounds. D4d and D6d are also forbidden because they contain improper rotations with n = 8 and 12 respectively. The 27 point groups in the table plus T, Td, Th, O and Oh constitute 32 crystallographic point groups.  

Groups with n = ∞ are called limit groups or Curie groups. There are two more limit groups, not listed in the table: K (for Kugel, German for ball, sphere), the group of all rotations in 3-dimensional space; and Kh, the group of all rotations and reflections. In mathematics and theoretical physics they are known respectively as the special orthogonal group and the orthogonal group in three-dimensional space, with the symbols SO(3) and O(3).

Space groups 
The space groups with given point group are numbered  by 1, 2, 3, ...  (in the same order as their international number) and this number is added as a superscript to the Schönflies symbol for the corresponding point group. For example, groups numbers 3 to 5 whose point group is C2 have Schönflies symbols C, C, C. 

While in case of point groups, Schönflies symbol defines the symmetry elements of group unambiguously, the additional superscript for space group doesn't have any information about translational symmetry of space group (lattice centering, translational components of axes and planes), hence one needs to refer to special tables, containing information about correspondence between Schönflies and Hermann–Mauguin notation. Such table is given in List of space groups page.

See also
Crystallographic point group
Point groups in three dimensions
List of spherical symmetry groups

References 
 Flurry, R. L., Symmetry Groups : Theory and Chemical Applications. Prentice-Hall, 1980.  LCCN: 79-18729
 Cotton, F. A., Chemical Applications of Group Theory, John Wiley & Sons: New York, 1990. 
 Harris, D., Bertolucci, M., Symmetry and Spectroscopy. New York, Dover Publications, 1989.

External links 
 Symmetry @ Otterbein

Symmetry
Spectroscopy
Crystallography